Stefan Flod (born 30 April 1985 in Gävle) and was the President of the Swedish Youth Organization Young Pirate (Ung Pirat). He was also member of the board in the Swedish Pirate Party (Piratpartiet).

External links 
http://www.stefanflod.dk/, Official Website
http://ungpirat.se/, Ung Pirat's official website

1985 births
Living people
Pirate Party (Sweden) politicians
Intellectual property activism
Copyright activists